The Spikers' Turf 1st Season Open Conference is the inaugural conference of Spikers' Turf. The opening ceremony was held on April 5, 2015 with the first match of volleyball game at the Filoil Flying V Arena in San Juan, Metro Manila. There were eight (8) competing teams in this conference.

Tournament Format

Preliminaries (PL)
Single Round-robin. Top four (4) teams qualified for the Semifinals.

Semi-finals (SF)
The four (4) semi-finalists will compete against each other in a single-round robin phase.
 Top two (2) SF teams will compete for GOLD.
 Bottom two (2) SF teams will compete for BRONZE.

Finals
The battle for GOLD and the battle for BRONZE will both follow the best-of-three format, provided:
 If the battle for GOLD ends in two (2) matches (2-0), then there will no longer be a Game 3 for either GOLD or Bronze. A tie in BRONZE (1-1) will be resolve using FIVB rules.
 A tie in the series for GOLD (1-1) after Game 2 will be broken in a Game 3, regardless of the result of the series in BRONZE.

Participating Teams

Season's Line-Up

Preliminaries

|}

|}

Semifinals

|}

|}

Finals
 Battle for Bronze

 Battle for Gold

Final standings

Individual awards

See also
 Shakey's V-League 12th Season Open Conference
 2015 PSL All-Filipino Conference

References

Spikers' Turf
2015 in volleyball
2015 in Philippine sport